Studieskolen is a language school situated in Copenhagen, Denmark.

Studieskolen is organized in 3 departments:

Foreign Languages (open courses)
Studieskolen’s foreign language department offers classes in more than 30 languages. The courses start 6 times a year.

Danish for Foreigners
Studieskolen’s Danish Language Centre teaches Danish for Foreigners under contract with the Municipality of Copenhagen. Students must be at least 18 years old and have a solid academic background with at least 12 years of schooling. They must also have learned English as a foreign language or speak English as their native language and have learned another foreign language.

Business Languages
Studieskolen’s Business Department offers language courses for the Business Community and one-to-one courses in all languages, including Danish.

Classroom locations
Studieskolen’s courses take place in the centre of Copenhagen, either at the school or in rooms at the University of Copenhagen.

Studieskolen’s instructors hold academic degrees – many from a university in countries where the native language is the one they teach.

Studieskolen is not a business nor a public school but rather somewhere in between, namely, an association. By law Studieskolen has an obligation "to enlighten the public".

Enrollment
Studieskolen offers Danish Education 3 which is designed for students with a solid academic background who can be expected to learn Danish as a foreign language quickly and efficiently. The progression is fast and the level high.

Studieskolen provides a wide range of Danish courses starting every six weeks at all levels -  also courses  for Swedish- and Norwegian-speaking students.

The courses cover six modules of Danish education. Module 6 is required for admission to higher education.

Languages
Studieskolen has courses in the following languages: Arabic, Bulgarian, Croatian, Czech, Danish, Dutch, English, Finnish, French, German, Greek, Hebrew, Hindi, Hungarian, Indonesian, Italian, Japanese, Mandarin, Persian, Polish, Portuguese, Russian, Serbian, Slovak, Spanish, Swahili, Swedish, Thai, Turkish and Vietnamese.

Tuition
If the students have a social security number (CPR) and residence permit in Denmark the school will send an application for subsidized lessons to the applicant's local council.

Notable alumni
Mary, Crown Princess of Denmark, the Danish princess, learned Danish here.

Vladimir Pimonov, journalist, Ph.D. in literature and linguistics.

References

External links
 - Official website of Studieskolen

Language schools
Education in Copenhagen